Naatturajavu is a 2004 Indian Malayalam-language action drama film directed by Shaji Kailas and written by T. A. Shahid. The film stars Mohanlal in the lead role and Meena, Nayanthara, Kalabhavan Mani, Kaviyoor Ponnamma , K. P. A. C. Lalitha, and Siddique in supporting roles. M. Jayachandran composed the film's soundtrack. It was produced by Antony Perumbavoor through Aashirvad Cinemas.  Naatturajavu was released in India on 20 August 2004, the film performed well at the box office, becoming one of the highest-grossing Malayalam films of the year.

Plot

Pulikkattil Charlie is a nasrani from Travancore, who has struggled hard to take care of his business empire after the death of his father Pulikkattil Mathachan. Charlie's father was a ruthless feudal landlord, who during his lifetime had done several heinous crimes. Charlie is now helping all those who had once suffered from the hands of his father.

Mani Kuttan, the son of an iron smith burned to death by Mathachan for demanding title deed rights of land is brought up by Charlie as a loving younger brother and a trusted confidant. After suffering a small injury as part of a squabble with Antappan, Manikuttan emotionally recollects witnessing as a child the dreadful killing of his parents by Mathachan with Charlie at night.

Charlie is married to a girl named Maya, whose family was annihilated by his father using trained wild dogs, barring her brother Karnan. As retribution, Pulikkattil Mathachan was brutally stabbed to death by Karnan, exacting his revenge eight years ago at a hillock. While being captured by the police after the murder, Karnan vowed to eliminate the remaining heir of the Pulikkattil family, thus specifying his intention to kill Charlie. For the murder of Mathachan, Karnan is imprisoned for eight years.

Though being a Hindu, Maya is looked after lovingly by Charlie and she too loves him very much. The couple have a toddler son too. Karnan is unaware of the fact that his sister is married to Charlie. Later, he realizes that Charlie is a good hearted person and gives up revenge and apologizes to Charlie.

Cast

 Mohanlal as Pulikkattil Charlie
 Meena as Maya, Pulikkattil Charlie's wife
 Nayanthara as Kathrina
 Kalabhavan Mani as Manikuttan, Charlie's trusted lieutenant
 Ranjith as Karnan, Maya's brother
 Vijayaraghavan as Sunnychayan / Pulikkattil Sunny
 Manoj K.Jayan as Antappan
 Kaviyoor Ponnamma as Charlie's Mother
 K. P. A. C. Lalitha as Achamma/Thathammachi 
 Mahadevan as Pulikattil Mathachan, Pulikkttil Charlie's father
 Rajan P Dev as Captain Menon
 Janardhanan as Fr. Pulikkattil Pappachan
 Vijayakumar as Peter, Charlie's advocate 
 Bindu Panicker as Thankamma, Antappan's mother
 Augustine as Bapputty
 Spadikam George as Ousepp, Antappan's uncle
 Santhosh as Alex, Antappan's uncle
 Sarath Das as Pulikkattil Simon
 Suja Karthika as Rosy Samuel
 Siddique as Pathiriveettil Josephkutty
 T. P. Madhavan as Secretary Philip 
 J. Pallassery as Babu, Market worker 
 Ottapalam Pappan as Chacko, quarry worker
 Jayakrishnan as Dr. IV Thomas
 Geetha Vijayan as Reena, Sibi's wife

Production
The filming progressed in Wadakkancherry, Thrissur district in June 2004. The film shot promo videos and recorded songs for television audience for the pre-release promotions, which was an emerging marketing method in Malayalam film industry at that time. The promo videos were directed by Rajesh Divakaran and edited by Don Max. The songs recorded for the purpose were not included in the filmwritten Joy Thamalam and composed by Sajjan Madhavan, son of Raveendran.

Soundtrack

The soundtrack composed by M. Jayachandran consists of 7 tracks. Lyrics for all songs were written by Gireesh Puthenchery, except the poem "Vande Mataram" by Bankim Chandra Chattopadhyay. The soundtrack was released on 1 May 2004 by East Coast Audio Entertainments.

Box office 
Naatturajavu was released on 20 August 2004 during Onam in Kerala. The film had a strong opening weekend in Kerala, grossing 1.12 crore from 54 stations in three days, and had good run particularly in Kozhikode and Thiruvananthapuram regions. It was the highest-grossing film among the Onam releases; according to Sify: "the only winner among the Onam releases". It was made on a budget of 1.75 crore, in 35 days, the film earned 2.27 crore as distributor's share alone from 51 stations. After that, it managed to run with 35  40 percent occupancy in Kerala theatres. Naatturajavu was the third highest-grossing Malayalam film of the year.

References

External links
 
 Naatturajavu review on Sify.com

2004 films
2000s Malayalam-language films
Indian action drama films
Indian family films
Films shot in Thrissur
Films scored by M. Jayachandran
Films directed by Shaji Kailas
2004 action drama films
Aashirvad Cinemas films